Argutoridius is a genus of beetles in the family Carabidae, containing the following species:

 Argutoridius abacetoides (Chaudoir, 1876)
 Argutoridius bonariensis (Dejean, 1831)
 Argutoridius chilensis (Dejean, 1828)
 Argutoridius cubensis (Darlington, 1937)
 Argutoridius depressulus Straneo, 1969
 Argutoridius oblitus (Dejean, 1831)
 Argutoridius pavens (Tschitscherine, 1900)
 Argutoridius uruguayicus (Chaudoir, 1876)
 Argutoridius zischkai Straneo, 1969

References

Pterostichinae